Amid Its Hallowed Mirth is the first full-length studio album by the American death-doom band Novembers Doom. It was originally released in 1995 on Avantgarde Records, and later re-released in 2001 with a different cover and different track listing on Dark Symphonies and in 2008, it remastered format with different artwork and bonus tracks on The End Records.

Track listing 

 The bonus tracks 10-11 are taken from the 1995 Her Tears Drop demo.
 The bonus tracks 12-15 are taken from the 1992 Scabs demo by the pre-Novembers Doom band called Laceration.

Personnel
 Paul Kuhr – vocals
 Steve Nicholson  – guitars, bass
 Joe Hernandez  – drums
 Cathy Jo Hejna – vocals

Additional personnel and staff
 Emmett Hall - drums on "Nothing Earthly Save the Thrill" and "Seasons of Frost"
 Jim Bresnhan - guitars on "Nothing Earthly Save the Thrill" and "Seasons of Frost"
 Jim Harvey - producer, engineering
 Ron Reid - producer, engineering
 Chris Wisco - mastering
 Mike Lager- Electric and Double Bass on "Sadness Reigns" and "A Dirge of Sorrow."  Lager also played bass on tracks 
"Scarification," "Winter Solstice," "Mammaliferous Earth," and "Crown of Thorns"
Unofficially we believe this to be the first bowed double bass in all of metal.  It was revolutionary at the time in 1992-1995.

References

External links 
 
 The End Records 2008 Reissue Announcement

1995 debut albums
Novembers Doom albums
Avantgarde Music albums
The End Records albums